was a Nippon Professional Baseball outfielder. From 1950 to 1953 he went by the name of Fukashi Minamimura.

External links

1917 births
1990 deaths
Baseball people from Osaka Prefecture
Nippon Professional Baseball outfielders
Japanese baseball players
Nishi Nippon Pirates players
Yomiuri Giants players
Nippon Professional Baseball coaches
Japanese baseball coaches